State Agency for National Security (ДАНС; Darzhavna agentsiya "Natsionalna sigurnost", DANS) is a specialized body for counterintelligence and security and its chief responsibility is to detect, prevent and neutralize the threats to the Bulgarian national security. It is the most powerful security agency of Bulgaria.
The Agency is constituted to guarantee no foreign interference in the internal affairs of Bulgaria and to provide the highest state authorities with information necessary for conducting the national security policy and for the decision-making process in compliance with the national interests. 
In order to fulfill its duties, DANS uses in its work the whole spectrum of counter-intelligence means and resources. The Agency is responsible for constantly improving its capabilities as an integral part of the Bulgarian Intelligence Community, the National Security System and the security system of the democratic community of the EU and the NATO member states.
.

References

Government agencies established in 2008
2008 establishments in Bulgaria
Bulgarian intelligence agencies
Bulgaria